Leslie Dunlop Campbell Jr. (January 26, 1925 – December 26, 2020) was an American lawyer and politician who served as a member of the Virginia state senate. The former commonwealth's attorney of Hanover County, he won the nomination for Senate in 1963 against former delegate Edmund T. DeJarnette. He was defeated in a 1975 Democratic primary challenge by Elmo Cross.

References

External links 
 

1925 births
2020 deaths
Democratic Party Virginia state senators
20th-century American politicians